John Nelson (June 1, 1791 – January 18, 1860) was an American lawyer and statesman who served as the Attorney General of the United States from 1843 to 1845 under President John Tyler. He served as the first United States Chargé d'Affaires to the Kingdom of the Two Sicilies from 1831 to 1832 and as the U.S. representative for Maryland's 4th district from 1821 to 1823.

Early life
Nelson was born in Frederick, Maryland on June 1, 1791.  He was the fourth child of Roger Nelson and Mary Brooke (née Sim) Nelson (d. 1794).  Among his siblings was Madison Nelson, Frederick Stembel Nelson, and Sarah (née Nelson) Maulsby. His father served as Brigadier general during the Revolutionary War (and one of the original members of the Society of Cincinnati) and, later, a U.S. Representative.

He graduated from the College of William and Mary in 1811, and was admitted to the bar in 1813, starting practice in Frederick.

Career
He held several local offices before being elected to the United States House of Representatives representing Maryland's 4th district. He served only one term, March 4, 1821, to March 3, 1823, and was not a candidate for reelection. Nelson received an A.M. degree from Princeton University in 1825.

In 1831, he was appointed Chargé d'affaires to the Two Sicilies, a position he served in from 1831 to 1832.

President John Tyler appointed him Attorney General of the United States on July 1, 1843. He served in this position until the end of the Tyler administration.  He also served as United States Secretary of State ad interim for about a month in 1844 after the sudden death of the previous Secretary of State Abel P. Upshur.

After the end of the Tyler administration, Nelson retired from public life and returned to Baltimore.

Personal life
Nelson was married to Frances Harriott Burrows (1798–1836), a daughter of William Ward Burrows I, the second Commandant of the Marine Corps, and the sister of William Ward Burrows II, a decorated officer in the United States Navy. Together, they were the parents of:

 Mary Sim Nelson (1819–1880), who married Alexander Neill (1808–1865).
 Rosa Londonia Nelson (1825–1894), who married Isaac Nevett Steele (1809–1891), brother of John Nevett Steele, and Mary Nevett Steele (the wife of John Campbell Henry, eldest son and heir of Maryland Governor John Henry).

After his first wife's death in 1836, he married Matilda Tennant (d. 1862), the daughter of Thomas Tennant, on March 13, 1838. Matilda and John were the parents of two children:

 Joseph Story Nelson
 Tennant Nelson

Nelson died in Baltimore, Maryland, on January 8, 1860.

Descendants
Through his daughter, he was the grandfather of Charles Steele, who was born in Baltimore and later spent 39 years as a partner in J.P. Morgan & Co. in New York City.

References

External links

1791 births
1860 deaths
United States Attorneys General
Princeton University alumni
Maryland lawyers
Ambassadors of the United States to the Kingdom of the Two Sicilies
College of William & Mary alumni
Politicians from Frederick, Maryland
Maryland Whigs
19th-century American politicians
Tyler administration cabinet members
Democratic-Republican Party members of the United States House of Representatives from Maryland
Acting United States Secretaries of State
19th-century American diplomats